Ukhunda is a large Village and a market area located in Jhumpura block of Kendujhar district in Odisha, India.

Demographics

The village has a population of 2506 of which 1247 are males while 1259 are females as per the Population Census 2011. The PIN Code of Ukhunda is 758032.

Transport

Ukhunda is well connected by Road. Kendujhar- Champua Road passes through the Ukhunda.

Regular bus services from major cities like Kendujhar (25KM), Bhubaneswar, cuttack, Kolkata.

Nearest railway station is Parjanpur and Kendujhar Railway station. 

Nearest airport is Bhubaneswar.

Educational institutions

 Utkalamani Gapobandhu College, Ukhunda

 Ukhunda High School

 Saraswati Sishu mandir

and many English Medium Schools

Health care

Ukhunda Govt. Hospital is one of the oldest hospitals of district

References

Villages in Kendujhar district